Fishermans Bay/LPS Seaplane Base  is a seaplane base located at Fishermans Bay on Lopez Island, in San Juan County, Washington, United States. It is owned by Lake Union Air Service, Inc.

Facilities 
Fishermans Bay/LPS Seaplane Base has seaplane landing areas: 5/23 is 4,000 by 200 feet (1,219 x 61 m) and 14/32 is 2,500 by 200 feet (762 x 61 m).

Airlines and destinations

See also 
 Lopez Island Airport

References

External links 
 Aerial image as of 21 July 1998 from USGS The National Map

Airports in Washington (state)
Airports in San Juan County, Washington
Seaplane bases in the United States